The Atlantic Hockey Best Defensive Forward is an annual award given out at the conclusion of the Atlantic Hockey regular season to the best defensive forward in the conference as voted by the coaches of each Atlantic Hockey team.

Award winners

Winners by school

Winners by position

See also
Atlantic Hockey Awards

References 

College ice hockey trophies and awards in the United States